The Canadian Railway Museum Musée ferroviaire canadien), operating under the brand name Exporail in both official languages, is a rail transport museum in Saint-Constant, Quebec, Canada, on Montreal's south shore.

Steam Locomotives

Diesel Locomotives

Collection
Established in 1961 by its owner and operator, the Canadian Railroad Historical Association, the museum maintains the largest collection of railway equipment in Canada with over 140 pieces of rolling stock.  There are also over 250,000 objects and documents from Canada's railway history in the collection which is maintained in the archives on the property.

The museum operates a heritage streetcar line around the grounds as well as a heritage railway which pulls a small passenger train on a former freight spur to Montée des Bouleaux.  The streetcar operates daily during the spring, summer and fall while the railway operates every Sunday during the same period.

Two big attractions are LB&SCR A1 class 54 Waddon & LNER Class A4 4489 Dominion of Canada, both of which are British in origin.

The museum underwent a significant expansion during the 2000s when the Angus Exhibit Pavilion opened.  Some of the most valuable items were placed in the new pavilion, which became the main exhibition building.

One of the most notable artifacts is former Canadian Pacific locomotive #2850, with a 4-6-4 wheel arrangement, known as a "Hudson type".  In 1939, this particular locomotive was responsible for pulling the Royal train carrying King George VI and Queen Elizabeth on the westbound leg of their trip across Canada. Because of this, #2850 and all engines of its class (H1c/H1d #2820-2859, H1e #2860-2864), were redesignated as Royal Hudsons. Except for the H1a/H1b classes #2800-2819.

Images

See also

List of heritage railways in Canada
List of museums in Canada
Canadian National
Canadian Pacific Railway
B&O Railroad Museum (US)
Locomotion: the National Railway Museum at Shildon (UK)
Nuremberg Transport Museum (Germany)
Workshops Rail Museum (Australia)

References

External links

Exporail Museum website

Museums established in 1961
Railway museums in Quebec
Heritage railways in Quebec
Heritage streetcar systems
Museums in Montérégie
Saint-Constant, Quebec
Preserved locomotives in Canada